Ilja Richter (born 24 November 1952 in East Berlin) is a German actor, voice actor, television presenter, singer, theatre director and author.

Life 
Ilja Richter was born to parents Georg and Eva Richter. Georg was a Communist, who named Ilja after the Russian journalist Ilya Ehrenburg, and Eva was a Jew who survived the Third Reich under a fake Aryan identity. Georg spent nine and a half years in the penitentiary and concentration camp during the Third Reich. 

After the family was in political difficulties in East Germany, they moved to West Berlin in 1953. There, the Richters leased a restaurant. In 1955, Ilja's sister Janina was born, and in 1959 they moved to Cologne. There, too, the Richters ran a restaurant, but moved back in 1960 to West Berlin, where they opened a guesthouse.

Eva, a former actress, brought Ilja to the Sender Freies Berlin (Radio Free Berlin) for an audition. Ilja's acting career began at the age of nine. As a teenager he starred in the series Till, the Boy Next Door as Albert. In the 1970s, Richter became famous in West-Germany as television presenter of Disco, a music show filmed before a young live audience in which he also performed in sketches.

As an actor, he played several roles in films and in theatre. He starred in several comedy movies alongside Rudi Carrell. As a voice actor, his most prominent role was lending his colourful, peppy voice to Timon from The Lion King. He also provided the German voices of Mike Wazowski in Monsters, Inc., Spot/Scott in Teacher's Pet (TV series), the title character of Count Duckula and Dave in The Penguins of Madagascar. One of his records is a German adaptation of Tiny Tim's Tiptoe Through the Tulips.

Richter wrote several books. He dated the singer Marianne Rosenberg from 1975 to 1978. From 1995 to 1997 he was married to singer Stephanie von Falkenhausen. He lives in Berlin with his longtime companion Barbara Ferun, and has one child, Kolja.

Filmography

Film
 1962: 
 1963: Piccadilly Zero Hour 12
 1969: I'm an Elephant, Madame
 1970: When the Mad Aunts Arrive
 1970: Who Laughs Last, Laughs Best 
 1970: 
 1970: Musik, Musik – da wackelt die Penne
 1971: Das haut den stärksten Zwilling um
 1971: Hilfe, die Verwandten kommen
 1971: The Mad Aunts Strike Out
 1971: Die Kompanie der Knallköppe
 1971: Wenn mein Schätzchen auf die Pauke haut
 1971: Aunt Trude from Buxtehude
 1972: Betragen ungenügend!
 1973: Blue Blooms the Gentian
 1973: Das Wandern ist Herrn Müllers Lust
 1983: The Roaring Fifties
 1996: 
 1998: Drei Chinesen mit dem Kontrabass
 2007: My Führer – The Really Truest Truth about Adolf Hitler

Television
 1963: Schwarz auf Weiß
 1965: Die Schneekönigin
 1967/1968: Till, der Junge von nebenan
 1969: Tony's Freunde
 1980: Bühne frei für Kolowitz (based on Enter Laughing)
 1980: Hollywood, ich komme
 1985: Ausgeträumt
 1985: Drei Damen vom Grill
 1985: Mein Freund Harvey
 1992: Sylter Geschichten
 1992: Treff am Alex
 1997: Wenn der Präsident zweimal klingelt
 1999: 
 1999: Im Namen des Gesetzes: Freitag der 13. 1999: Tatort: Blinde Karriere
 1999: SOKO 5113: "Fauler Zauber"
 1999: Spuk im Reich der Schatten 2000: Tatort: "Mauer des Schweigens"
 2000: Spuk im Reich der Schatten 2002: SOKO Kitzbühel: "Ein tiefer Fall"
 2002: Herz in Flammen 2003: Körner und Köter 2003: Schlosshotel Orth 2005: Eine Prinzessin zum Verlieben 2005: Ein Hund, zwei Koffer und die ganz große Liebe 2005: Liebe süß, sauer 2005: In aller Freundschaft 2006: Ich leih mir eine Familie 2006/2007: Pocoyo (voice) 2007: Die ProSieben Märchenstunde: "Dornröschen: Ab durch die Hecke"
 2008: Tierärztin Dr. Mertens 2008: 4 Singles 2009: Romeo und Jutta 2009: Klick ins Herz 2010: Forsthaus Falkenau 2010: Notruf Hafenkante Awards 
 1975: Bravo Otto in Gold
 1977: Goldene Kamera
 2005: Curt-Goetz-Ring
 2010: Deutscher Hörbuchpreis

 Songs 
 1961 – "Schokolade, Pfefferminz, saure Drops"
 1961 – "Lausbubentwist"
 1961 – "Ich möchte am Broadway Blümchen pflücken"
 1969 – "Tip-Tap in die Tulpen"
 1970 – "Ich hol' dir gerne vom Himmel die Sterne"
 1972 – "Eine Goldmedaille für deine Supertaille"
 1977 – "Tip-Tap in die Tulpen" (new version)
 1979 – "Liebe im Büro"
 1984 – "Liebeslied"

 Books 
 Star-Szene '77. 1000 Top-Stars presented by Ilja Richter, Verlagsgesellschaft für Nachschlagewerke, Taunusstein 1977.
 Eva Richter, Ilja Richter: Der deutsche Jude. In: Bibliothek der deutschen Werte. Droemer Knaur 2766 satire, Munich 1993. .
 Ilja Richter, Harald Martenstein: Meine Story. dtv  2001,  (original title: Spot aus! Licht an! – Meine Story. Hoffmann and Campe, Hamburg 1999).
 Ilja Richter, Viola Roggenkamp: Meine Mamme with an essay about Jews born in Germany after the Holocaust and their heritage, Fischer 16740. Frankfurt am Main 2005. .
 Ilja Richter, Erich Rauschenbach (illustrator): Bruno – Von Bären und Menschen.'' Boje, Cologne 2007. .

External links 

 

1952 births
Living people
People from East Berlin
German people of Jewish descent
German television presenters
German male film actors
German male television actors
German male voice actors
20th-century German male singers
20th-century German male actors
20th-century German writers
21st-century German male actors
21st-century German writers
21st-century German male writers
20th-century German male writers
ZDF people
Radio Bremen people